Woodleigh is a locality located in Bass Coast Shire in Victoria, Australia.

References 

Towns in Victoria (Australia)
Bass Coast Shire